Ruscism, also known as Rashism, Russism, or Russian fascism, is a term used by a number of scholars, politicians and publicists to describe the political ideology and social practices of the Russian state in the late 20th and early 21st centuries, and especially during the rule of Vladimir Putin. "Ruscism" and "Russism" are portmanteaus combining the words 'Russian' and 'fascism'; "Rashism" is a rough transcription of the Russian and Ukrainian equivalent (also a portmanteau). It is also used to refer to the ideology of Russian military expansionism, and has been used as a label to describe an undemocratic system and nationality cult mixed with ultranationalism and a cult of personality. That transformation was described as based on the ideas of the "special civilizational mission" of the Russians, such as Moscow as the third Rome and expansionism, which manifests itself in anti-Westernism and supports regaining former lands by conquest. The term "Rashist" is also widely used by Ukrainian officials and media to more generally identify members of the Russian Armed Forces and supporters of Russian military aggression against Ukraine.

The modern use of the term can be traced back to 1995, when it was used in the context of the First Chechen War, but it became increasingly more common after the Russo-Georgian and Russo-Ukrainian wars and most recently the 2022 Russian invasion of Ukraine.

Etymology and terminology 
Ruscism and Rashism are both attempts to transliterate the Ukrainian and Russian term  (rashizm), a multilingual portmanteau of "Russia" and "fascism." According to Timothy D. Snyder, the word is complex, reflecting and referencing pronunciations of words in English, Ukrainian and Russian. The Washington Post asserts that the word “racism” (расизм in Ukrainian and Russian) also contributes to the understood meaning of “rashism.”

History of use

Chechen wars 
The term was, in the form Russism or Ruscism popularized, described and extensively used in 1995 by President of the unrecognised Chechen state Ichkeria Dzhokhar Dudayev, who saw the military action by Russia in Chechnya as a manifestation of the rising far-right ideology. According to Dudayev, Ruscism is 
 Dudayev is believed to have borrowed the term from either the works of the Russian revolutionary and philosopher Aleksandr Herzen or Russian philosopher and diplomat Konstantin Leontiev.

After Dudaev's death the term continued to be used by the leaders and ideologists of the Chechen rebels, most notably Aslan Maskhadov who as the serving president of Ichkeria named Ruscism the main enemy of Chechnya in a 2004 interview, while the Chechen news website Kavkaz Center featured a regular column titled "Russism", in which around 150 articles were published between 2003 and 2016.

Russo-Georgian and Russo-Ukrainian wars  

The term  (Ruscism/Rashism) became increasingly common in informal circles in 2008, during the Russo-Georgian War. It was used in Ukrainian media after the annexation of the Ukrainian Crimean peninsula by the Russian Federation, the downing of a Boeing 777 near Donetsk on 17 July 2014, and the start of the Russo-Ukrainian War in 2014. It appears in the Russian-language song "That's, Baby, Ruscism! Orthodox Fascism!]" by Ukrainian composer and singer-songwriter .

The Committee of the Verkhovna Rada on Humanitarian and Information Policy supports the initiative of Ukrainian scientists, journalists, political scientists and all civil society to promote and recognize the term "Ruscism" at the national and international levels.

2022 Russian invasion of Ukraine 

By 2022 and the Russian invasion of Ukraine, the terms Rashyzm and Rashyst had come into common usage among military and political elites of Ukraine, as well as by journalists, influencers, bloggers and others. For example, Oleksiy Danilov, Secretary of the National Security and Defense Council of Ukraine, actively advocates the use of the word in the meaning of Vladimir Putin's fascism to describe Russia's aggression against Ukraine. He also stated that Ruscism is much worse than fascism.

On 23 April 2022, President of Ukraine Volodymyr Zelenskyy stated that a new concept called "Ruscism" will be in history books:
According to the Courthouse News Service, Ukrainian propaganda during the period of Russia's invasion of Ukraine called Russian troops "ruscists".

Ideological history

Ivan Ilyin 
Timothy D. Snyder of Yale University believes that the ideology of Putin and his regime was influenced by Russian nationalist philosopher Ivan Ilyin (1883–1954). A number of Ilyin's works advocated fascism. Ilyin has been quoted by President of Russia Vladimir Putin, and is considered by some observers to be a major ideological inspiration for Putin. Putin was personally involved in moving Ilyin's remains back to Russia, and in 2009 consecrated his grave.

According to Snyder, Ilyin "provided a metaphysical and moral justification for political totalitarianism" in the form of a fascist state, and that today "his ideas have been revived and celebrated by Vladimir Putin".

Ilyin's book, Our Tasks was in 2013 recommended as essential reading for state officials by the Russian government, while What Dismemberment of Russia Would Mean for the World is said to have been "read and reread" by Putin according to The Economist.

Aleksandr Dugin 
In 1997, Russian thinker Aleksandr Dugin, widely known for fascistic views, published The Foundations of Geopolitics: The Geopolitical Future of Russia, a book believed to have garnered significant impact among Russia's military, police and foreign policy elites. In it, he argued that Ukraine should be annexed by Russia because "Ukraine as a state has no geopolitical meaning", "no particular cultural import or universal significance, no geographic uniqueness, no ethnic exclusiveness", that "[its] certain territorial ambitions represen[t] an enormous danger for all of Eurasia and, without resolving the Ukrainian problem, it is in general senseless to speak about continental politics". He argued that Ukraine should not be allowed to remain independent, unless it is "sanitary cordon", which would be "inadmissible". The book may have been influential in Vladimir Putin's foreign policy, which eventually led to the 2022 Russian invasion of Ukraine. Also in 1997, Dugin hailed what he saw as the arrival of a "genuine, true, radically revolutionary and consistent, fascist fascism" in Russia, in an article titled "Fascism – Borderless and Red"; previously in 1992, he had in another article defended "fascism" as not having anything to do with "the racist and chauvinist aspects of National Socialism", stating in contrast that "Russian fascism is a combination of natural national conservatism with a passionate desire for true changes." Another of Dugin's books, The Fourth Political Theory, published in 2009, has been cited as an inspiration for Russian policy in events such as the war in Donbas, and for the contemporary European far-right in general.

Although there is a dispute on the extent of the personal relationship between Dugin and Putin, Dugin's influence exists broadly in Russian military and security circles. He became a lecturer at the Military Academy of the General Staff of the Armed Forces of Russia in the 1990s, and his Foundations of Geopolitics has become part of the curriculum there, as well as in several other military/police academies and institutions of higher learning. According to John B. Dunlop of the Hoover Institution, "[t]here has perhaps not been another book published in Russia during the post-communist period that has exerted an influence on Russian military, police, and foreign policy elites comparable to that of [...] Foundations of Geopolitics."

Timofey Sergeitsev 

According to Euractiv, Russian political operative Timofey Sergeitsev is "one of the ideologists of modern Russian fascism".

During the large-scale Russian invasion of Ukraine, when the victims of the massacres in Kyiv Oblast became known, the website of the Russian state news agency RIA Novosti published an article by Sergeitsev titled "What Russia Should Do with Ukraine", which was perceived to justify a Ukrainian genocide. It calls for repression, de-Ukrainization, de-Europeanization, and ethnocide of the Ukrainians. According to Oxford expert on Russian affairs Samuel Ramani, the article "represents mainstream Kremlin thinking". The head of the Latvian Ministry of Foreign Affairs Edgars Rinkēvičs called the article "ordinary fascism". Timothy D. Snyder described it as a "genocide handbook", and as "one of the most openly genocidal documents I have ever seen".

Similar rhetoric appeared in 26 February op-ed by Peter Akopov in RIA Novosti titled "The Coming of Russia and of the New World", which praised Putin for a timely "solution of the Ukrainian question". It was un-published after three hours.

In Russia 

According to the Economist, as a political calculation in response to his waning popularity in the early 2010s, Vladimir Putin began to draw more heavily on post-Soviet fascist thinking, concepts which emerged after the collapse of the Soviet Union. The highly popular 2000 film Brother 2 by Alexei Balabanov has been "a key contributor" to Ruscism becoming the cultural mainstream of Putinist Russia by seemingly concidentally containing "the main framework of the quasi-ideological narrative, as well as its most forceful formulations, which have since been recycled by almost every major political party in Russia", according to professor at the Department of Slavic Languages of Columbia University Mark Lipovetsky. In 2007, the first post-Soviet Prime Minister of Russia, Yegor Gaidar, warned about the rise of post-imperial nostalgia, stating that "Russia is going through a dangerous phase", and making a reference to history by stating "[w]e should not succumb to the magic of numbers but the fact that there was a 15-year gap between the collapse of the German Empire and Adolf Hitler's rise to power and 15 years between the collapse of the USSR and Russia in 2006–07 makes one think". 

In 2014, Boris Nemtsov criticized what he perceived as a turn towards "cultivating and rewarding the lowest instincts in people, provoking hatred and fighting" by the Russian regime, stating in his final interview – hours before his assassination – that "Russia is rapidly turning into a fascist state. We already have propaganda modelled after Nazi Germany. We also have a nucleus of assault brigades ... That’s just the beginning." Alexander Yakovlev, architect of democratic reforms under Mikhail Gorbachev, made statements about the connection between the security services and fascism, stating "[t]he danger of fascism in Russia is real because since 1917 we have become used to living in a criminal world with a criminal state in charge. Banditry, sanctified by ideology—this wording suits both communists and fascists."

Several scholars have posited that Russia has transformed into a fascist state, or that fascism best describes the Russian political system, especially following the 2022 Russian invasion of Ukraine. In 2017, Russian academician Vladislav Inozemtsev considered that Russia is an early-stage fascist state, thus claiming the current Russian political regime as fascist. Tomasz Kamusella, a Polish scholar on nationalism and ethnicity, and Allister Heath, a journalist at The Daily Telegraph, describe the current authoritarian Russian political regime as Putin's fascism. Political scientist Maria Snegovaya believes that Russia as led by Putin is a fascist regime.

In March 2022, Yale historian Odd Arne Westad said that Putin's words about Ukraine resembled, which Harvard journalist James F. Smith summarized, "some of the colonial racial arguments of imperial powers of the past, ideas from the late 19th and early 20th century".

In April 2022,  from the Institute of History of Ukraine in her article "The Anatomy of Ruscism" stated that Russia has never reflected on the tragedies of totalitarianism and did not decommunize its Soviet totalitarian heritage unlike Ukraine. According to her, that was the major reason for the formation and rapid development of Ruscism in modern Russia both among political and intellectual/cultural elites. She also noted that Ruscism, in the form of a threat to the world order and peace, will remain until there is a global condemnation of Soviet communist ideology and its heir Ruscism.

On 24 April 2022, Timothy D. Snyder published an article in The New York Times Magazine where he described the history, premises and linguistic peculiarities of the term "Ruscism". According to Snyder, the term "is a useful conceptualization of Putin's worldview", writing that "we have tended to overlook the central example of fascism's revival, which is the Putin regime in the Russian Federation". On the wider regime, Snyder writes that "[p]rominent Russian fascists are given access to mass media during wars, including this one. Members of the Russian elite, above all Putin himself, rely increasingly on fascist concepts", and states that "Putin's very justification of the war in Ukraine [...] represents a Christian form of fascism."

Snyder followed this article in May with an essay titled "We Should Say It. Russia Is Fascist". According to Snyder, "[m]any hesitate to see today's Russia as fascist because Stalin's Soviet Union defined itself as antifascist", stating that the key to understanding Russia today is "Stalin's flexibility about fascism": "Because Soviet anti-fascism just meant defining an enemy, it offered fascism a backdoor through which to return to Russia [...] Fascists calling other people 'fascists' is fascism taken to its illogical extreme as a cult of unreason. [...] [It is] the essential Putinist practice". Based on this, Snyder refers Putin's regime as schizo-fascism.

In July 2022, Japanese-American political scientist Francis Fukuyama stated that Putin's regime in Russia more than anything resembles to that of Nazi Germany whose only ideology is extreme nationalism, but it is at the same time "less institutionalised and revolves only around one man Vladimir Putin".

In an February 2023 interview with independent Russian newspaper Meduza, Slovenian philosopher Slavoj Žižek stated his opinion that "[t]he ideology of people around Putin, and Putin himself, seems quite clear-cut. It’s Neo-Fascism. They don’t use this term, but the entire framework of Russian imperialist views — with the right to aggressively expand the state borders, the internal politics with regard to oligarchs, etc. — this mindset is the core of what we would call Neo-Fascism."

Characteristics 

In 2017, Yuliia Strebkova of Igor Sikorsky Kyiv Polytechnic Institute indicated that Ruscism in combination with Ukrainophobia constitutes the ethno-national vector of the more broad Russian neo-imperial ideological doctrine of "Russian world".

In 2018, Borys Demyanenko (Pereiaslav-Khmelnytskyi State Pedagogical University) in his paper Ruscism' as a quasi-ideology of the post-Soviet imperial revenge" defined Ruscism as a misanthropic ideology and an eclectic mixture of imperial neocolonialism, great-power chauvinism, nostalgia for the Soviet past, and religious traditionalism. Demyanenko considers that in internal domestic policy, Ruscism manifests itself in a violation of human rights along with a freedom of thought, persecution of dissidents, propaganda, ignoring of democratic procedures. While in foreign policy, Ruscism demonstrates itself in a violation of international law, imposing its own version of historical truth, the justification of occupation and annexation of the territories of other states.

Political scientist Stanislav Belkovsky argues that Ruscism is disguised as anti-fascism, but has a fascist face and essence. Political scientist Ruslan Kliuchnyk notes that the Russian elite considers itself entitled to build its own "sovereign democracy" without reference to Western standards, but taking into account Russia's traditions of state-building. Administrative resources in Russia are one of the means of preserving the democratic facade, which hides the mechanism of absolute manipulation of the will of citizens. Russian political scientist Andrey Piontkovsky argues that the ideology of Ruscism is in many ways similar to Nazism, with the speeches of President Vladimir Putin reflecting similar ideas to those of Adolf Hitler.

According to Alexander J. Motyl, an American historian and political scientist, Russian fascism has the following characteristics:

 An undemocratic political system, different from both traditional authoritarianism and totalitarianism;
 Statism and hypernationalism;
 A hypermasculine cult of the supreme leader (emphasis on his courage, militancy and physical prowess);
 General popular support for the regime and its leader.

According to Professor , Ruscism is an ideology that is "based on illusions and justifies the admissibility of any arbitrariness for the sake of misinterpreted interests of Russian society. In foreign policy, Ruscism manifests itself, in particular, in violation of the principles of international law, imposing its version of historical truth on the world solely in favor of Russia, abusing the right of veto in the UN Security Council, and so on. In domestic politics, Ruscism is a violation of human rights to freedom of thought, persecution of members of the 'dissent movement', the use of the media to misinform their people, and so on." Oleksandr Kostenko also considers Ruscism a manifestation of sociopathy.

Timothy D. Snyder argued in an essay that a "time traveler from the 1930s" would "have no difficulty" identifying the Russian regime in 2022 as fascist, writing:

Boris Kagarlitsky notes that unlike "the classical fascism", Putin's regime is "Fascism in the era of Postmodernism", "when a coherent worldview is replaced by a haphazard pasting together of ideas, scraps of concepts and randomly assembled images", "the product of the... degradation of late Soviet society combined with the degradation of late capitalism": "using totalitarian ideology and rhetoric, the system is unable to build a workable totalitarian machine that corresponds to these principles".

According to Ilya Budraitskis, Russia has evolved from a “managed democracy” with limited personal freedoms to a new form of a society, to "post-fascism" by the devinition of Enzo Traverso, that requires unequivocal acceptance of the Ukraine invasion and treats any sign of deviation as treason. "Russian society, after thirty years of post-Soviet authoritarianism and neoliberal market reforms, has consistently been reduced to a state of silent victimhood, a malleable material from which a full-fledged fascist regime can be built. External aggression, based on the complete dehumanisation of the enemy [...], was the decisive moment in the "move" made from above." Budraitskis noted that unlike Fascism of the 20th-century, which was a "movement", the "modern fascism" is a "move" made from above", as by Traverso's definition, "post-fascism... no longer needs mass movements or a more or less coherent ideology. It seeks to affirm social inequality and the subordination of the lower classes to the higher classes as unconditional as the only possible reality and the only credible law of society."

Russian sociologist Grigory Yudin states that the social atomization of Soviet society during the "Era of Stagnation" and later neoliberal reforms and economic globalization (which helped Putin to establish an authoritarian regime and turned Russia into "a radical version of modern neoliberal capitalism") have lead to Russian society becoming extremely depolitized and atomized, on February 24 it was mobilized. According to him, it is accurate to the historical Fascist regimes, which also used to demobilize and atomize the societies, and then used the atomization to mobilize them. He also says that the image of general popular support for Putin is false and that it's being used by Putin to threat the elites and the people: the elites fear that 'the people' will support repressions against them, while individuals of the atomized society fear that if they express their disagreement, they will alone confront the non-existent "people masses". Kagarlitsky argued that the term "molecurization" is more adequate, as the society is split not into atoms, but into "molecules - households, which can be considered the last historical form of existence of the Russian community."

Tomasz Kamusella highlights the important and often overlooked role of Russian language in Ruscism, which, unlike other widely used postcolonial languages, such as English, French or Spanish, hasn't undergone de-ethnicization, allowing the government of Russia to exclusively claim all Russian speakers as members of the Russian nation and vow to “protect“ them by expanding Russia's territorial borders until they fully overlap with this perceived “Russian world“ or Greater Russia. In practice, Russian world is more broadly equated with the use of the “Russian alphabet“ of cyrillic, which since 2002 has been imposed as the writing system on all Russia's non-Russian languages to secure an “all-Russian“ unity and bridge the "ideological discrepancy" of around one fifth of Russia's inhabitants ethnically being non-Russian. Simulteneously, the existence of Russian speaking communities in countries such as Belarus and Ukraine has been used by some Russian ideologues to claim that Belarus or Ukraine are “pseudo-states“, because Belarusian and Ukrainian are not “real languages“. According to Kamusella, ethnolinguistic nationalism officially became part of the Russian government's ideology in 2007 with the creation of the Russkiy Mir Foundation, while the weaponization of Russian language and culture and transition of it from an element of soft power to hard power took place after the 2014 Russian annexation of Crimea.

Reactions

In Russia 
In 2014, Russian actor Ivan Okhlobystin, who holds pro-Putin views, publicly called himself a "Rashist" and made a tattoo "as a sign that I'm a Rashist, I'll live as a Rashist and I'll die as a Rashist". In 2015, he released a series of wristwatches with Chi Rho and the text "I am Rashist" ("") on the clock face, written with a Gothic font, and with "Not only Crimea's ours - everything's ours!" on the back. The term was also embraced by the well-known Russian nationalist  who published an article titled "Russism. Choosing Putin", in which he broke down Russism into three components: "Russia is above all. Russia is a state of Russians. The Lord is with Russia and the Russians".

Russian economist Yakov Mirkin said that the term "Rashizm" is incorrect because it equates the entire Russian nation with "the ideology that brings trouble". He noted that as Nazism has never been called "Germanism" and Italian fascism has never been called "Italism", Putin's ideology should be called "as you wish", with "the most cruel nicknames", but not "Rashizm".

Artyom Yefimov wrote in Signal (email-based media created by Meduza) that although the word "Rashizm" was created in Ukraine as an emotional cliché, it may become a real term, as history knows examples of pejoratives being turned into real terms (e.g. Tory and Slavophilia); in Ukraine, he writes, it is being used in scientific works since 2014 (although rarely in scientific publications of other countries).

Leonid Srochnikov from Socialist Alternative argued the term "post-fascism" and instead suggested the Marxist term "Bonapartism" and compared Putin's regime with Marx's description of the regime of Napoleon III and its relationship with the French bourgeoisie. In his opinion, "Post-fascism" in this case was needed to sidestep the issue of the political history of Putin regime" and its connection with Yeltsin's regime and privatization of 1990s, viewing only the economic of its development.

Official reaction 
Russian television presenter Tina Kandelaki, who supported Russia's war against Ukraine, criticized Wikipedia's use of the term "Rashizm" on her Telegram channel, accusing Wikipedia of "digital fascism" targeting Russian people and calling Russians to stop using it.

Russia's federal censor Roskomnadzor reportedly ordered the English Wikipedia on 18 May 2022 to take down the articles "Rashizm" and "2022 Russian invasion of Ukraine", asserting that they contain false information about the war the Russian government calls a "special military operation". After Wikimedia Foundation refused to do so, a Moscow court imposed a 88,000 USD fine, a decision that the foundation has appealed.

On 20 May 2022, during the show Evening with Vladimir Solovyov, the host Vladimir Solovyov and his panelists responded with outrage at Timothy D. Snyder's article "We Should Say It. Russia Is Fascist", an article which according to Russian media watchdog Julia Davis has "spread through Russian state media like wildfire". Solovyov attacked Snyder by calling him a "pseudo-professor of a pseudo-university" and "simply a liar", and, addressing Americans, stating: "Let me tell you a secret: first of all, your signs are idiotic in their nature. Secondly, looking at your listed indications, how are they any different from the election campaign of Donald Trump?"

Outside Russia 
Latvian journalist Bens Latkovskis of Neatkarīgā Rīta Avīze has criticized the equation of Russism to fascism as terminologically inaccurate, stating that the main difference between the two ideologies is one that actually places them on almost opposite sides of the political spectrum. He argues that, unlike fascism that sought to create a new anthropological order and required mass social involvement, Russism is counter-revolutionary, strictly opposed to any social reforms and social mobilization and aims at the depoliticization of society, which it sees as a threat to its existence.

See also 

 Anti-American sentiment in Russia
 Black Hundreds
 Chekism
 Eurasianism
 Nashism
 On the Historical Unity of Russians and Ukrainians
 On conducting a special military operation
 What Russia Should Do with Ukraine
 Propaganda in Russia
 Putler
 Racism in Russia
 Russian imperialism
 Russian irredentism
 Russian nationalism
 Russification
 Russian war crimes
 Vatnik (slang)
 Victory Cult

Notes

References

Further reading

External links 

 neveragain.media/en/
 WHAT IS RUSCISM? (video)

 
Russian irredentism
Political ideologies
Propaganda in Russia
Propaganda in Ukraine related to the 2022 Russian invasion of Ukraine
Russian nationalism
Anti-Ukrainian sentiment in Russia